Knowledge Organization Systems (KOS), concept system or concept scheme is a generic term used in knowledge organization for authority files, classification schemes, thesauri, topic maps, ontologies and similar works. Despite their differences in type, coverage and application all KOS aim to support the organization of knowledge and information to facilitate their management and retrieval. The core elements of most KOS can be expressed in RDF with the Simple Knowledge Organization System (SKOS). Many lists of KOS exist with BARTOC being the largest and most general one.

See also
Library and information science
Library classification
Controlled vocabulary

References

Hodge, G. (2000). Systems of Knowledge Organization for Digital libraries. Beyond traditional authority files. Washington, DC: the Council on Library and Information Resources. http://www.clir.org/pubs/reports/pub91/contents.html

Garshol, L M (2004) Metadata? Thesauri? Taxonomies? Topic maps! Making sense of it all. Journal of Information Science, 30 (4). 378-391. Online tilgængelig: https://web.archive.org/web/20081017174807/http://www.ontopia.net/topicmaps/materials/tm-vs-thesauri.html

Tudhope, D. & Lykke Nielsen, M. (2006). Introduction to special issue: Knowledge Organization Systems and Services. New Review of Hypermedia and Multimedia, 12(1), 3-9. http://www.journalsonline.tandf.co.uk/media/m35eac0c7l6wvk510nr7/contributions/r/0/7/7/r077564631920800.pdf

Zeng, M. L. & Chan, L. M. (2004). Trends and issues in establishing interoperability among knowledge organization systems. Journal for the American Society for Information Science and Technology, 55(5), 377-395.

Networked Knowledge Organization Systems/Services NKOS: http://nkos.slis.kent.edu/

External links
 Knowledge Organization Systems (KOS)†

Knowledge management
Organization
Library science terminology
Information science
Controlled vocabularies